Head in the Clouds may refer to:

Head in the Clouds (film), a 2004 Canadian-British film
Head in the Clouds (album), a 2018 compilation album by 88rising
"Head in the Clouds" (song), a song by Gerry Cinnamon
"Head in the Clouds", a song by Union J from the album Union J
Head in the Clouds Festival, an annual Asian-diaspora music festival organized by 88rising